Bell Elementary School may refer to:
 Alexander Graham Bell School (Chicago, Illinois)
 Bell Elementary School - Bell, Florida - Gilchrist County School District
 Bell Elementary School - Monticello, Kentucky - Wayne County School District
 Bell Elementary School - Papillion, Nebraska - Papillion La Vista Community Schools
 LJ Bell Elementary School - Rockingham, North Carolina - Richmond County Schools
 Bell Elementary School (also Bell Public Schools) - Stilwell, Oklahoma - Belfonte Public Schools
 Catherine Coleman Bell Elementary School - Little Elm, Texas - Denton Independent School District
 Kate Bell Elementary School - Houston, Texas - List of Houston Independent School District elementary schools